The Autoridade da Concorrência (AdC) is the Portuguese name for the country's competition regulator, an organisation established to ensure fair commercial competition in Portugal.

Notable cases
In 2017, AdC ruled to fine the Portugal’s largest company, the utility EDP Group, 28.7 million euros ($31.54 million) and retailer Sonae 9.6 million euros for an illegal non-competition pact between their subsidiaries; under a 2012 agreement, Sonae had committed itself to not competing against EDP in electricity trading in Portugal for two years.

In 2019, AdC fined four insurance companies a total of 54 million euros ($59.6 million) for “cartel practices”, with the biggest fines imposed on the local branch of Zurich Insurance Group and Portuguese insurer Lusitania.

Also in 2019, AdC fined 14 banks a total of 225 million euros ($248.6 million) for concerted practices of exchanging sensitive commercial information on credit products. The fines were imposed on Portugal’s biggest bank at the time, Caixa Geral de Depósitos, as well as Millennium BCP, BBVA, Banco BIC Português, Banco Português de Investimento (BPI), Banco Espírito Santo, BANIF, Barclays, Caixa de Credito Agricola, Montepio, Santander, Deutsche Bank and Unión de Créditos Inmobiliarios (UCI).

In 2020, AdC imposed fines worth a total 304 million euros on six supermarket chains, including retailers Sonae and Jerónimo Martins, and two beverage suppliers for illegally fixing prices between 2008 and 2017.

See also
Competition law
Competition policy
Competition regulator
Consumer protection

References

External links
Autoridade da Concorrência

Competition regulators
Consumer organisations in Portugal
Regulators of Portugal